Juris Lauciņš (25 May 1957 – 23 December 2013) was a Latvian-Russian actor, whose career spanned over 45 years.

Born in Daugavpils, Latvian SSR, Soviet Union (now Latvia), Lauciņš began his acting career at age ten in 1967 and appeared in film, television and stage roles, before beginning his career in Russia SFSR and eventually Russia.

Juris Lauciņš died from throat cancer on 23 December 2013, aged 56, in Moscow, Russia.

Selected filmography
Gloss (2007)
Yuri's Day (2008)

References

1957 births
2013 deaths
Latvian male television actors
Latvian male film actors
Latvian male stage actors
Russian male television actors
Russian male film actors
Russian male stage actors
Latvian expatriates in Russia
Actors from Daugavpils
Deaths from cancer in Russia
20th-century Latvian male actors
21st-century Latvian male actors
Russian male child actors